Özler can refer to the following places in Turkey:

 Özler, Aşkale
 Özler, Gercüş